Larvik Station is a railway station at Larvik  in Vestfold, Norway. The station is served with regional trains operated by Vy. The station operated as part of the Vestfold Line (Vestfoldbanen). The station building was designed by Balthazar Lange and was opened on 13 October 1881.

References

External links
Jernbaneverket's entry on Larvik station 

Railway stations in Larvik
Railway stations on the Vestfold Line
Railway stations opened in 1881
1881 establishments in Norway